Europe of the Peoples–The Greens (EdP–V) was a Spanish electoral alliance formed for the 2009 European Parliament election in Spain.

The alliance consisted of eleven parties, nine leftwing nationalist and two green. All member parties were allied with either the European Free Alliance or the European Greens. The program of the alliance emphasized multiculturalism, environmentalism, democratic reform, peace and a commitment to a social Europe.

The electoral support was enough to give the alliance one seat in the European Parliament: this was taken by Oriol Junqueras from the Catalan ERC. The MEP was expected to sit in the European Greens–European Free Alliance group in the European Parliament.

Junqueras stood down in 2012 and was replaced by Ana Miranda Paz of the Galician Nationalist Bloc.

Composition

Electoral performance

European Parliament

References

External links
www.europadelospueblos.net/ in Catalan, Basque, Aragonese, Asturian and Castillian.

Defunct political party alliances in Spain
Defunct socialist parties in Spain
Galician Nationalist Bloc